Joseph-Ferdinand Daniel (4 November 1869 – 1 August 1940) was a Canadian politician.

Born in Saint-Esprit, Quebec, Daniel studied at the Séminaire de Joliette and the Université Laval à Montréal. He became a notary in 1896 and practised in Saint-Esprit. He was acclaimed to the Legislative Assembly of Quebec for Montcalm in a 1917 byelection. A Liberal, he was re-elected in 1919, 1923, and 1927. He was appointed to the Legislative Council of Quebec for the division of Lanaudière in 1929. He died in office in Montreal in 1940. His son, Jean-Gaétan Daniel, was also a politician.

References

1869 births
1940 deaths
Quebec Liberal Party MLCs
Quebec Liberal Party MNAs